Teuchocnemus is a genus of North American flower flies.

Species
Teuchocnemis bacuntius (Walker, 1849)
Teuchocnemis lituratus (Loew, 1863)

References

External links
Photographs on Bugguide:
 Teuchocnemis bacuntius
 Teuchocnemis lituratus

Hoverfly genera
Taxa named by Carl Robert Osten-Sacken
Diptera of North America
Eristalinae